Boisseaux is a commune in the Loiret department in north-central France. Boisseaux station has rail connections to Orléans, Étampes and Paris.

Population

See also
Communes of the Loiret department

References

Communes of Loiret